Stark Township is an inactive township in Hickory County, in the U.S. state of Missouri.

Stark Township was established in 1845, taking its name from Starks Creek.

References

Townships in Missouri
Townships in Hickory County, Missouri